Maicon Pereira de Oliveira (8 May 1988 – 8 February 2014) commonly known as Maicon, was a Brazilian footballer who played in the Ukrainian Premier League for most of his professional career. He performed as a striker.

Club career

Volyn Lutsk
Maicon was born in Rio de Janeiro, Brazil.  In 2009, he moved to Ukrainian Premier League club Volyn Lutsk from Atlético Mogi. In his first season with the club he scored 13 goals in 18 matches in the First League (Persha Liha), guiding Volyn to promotion to the Premier League after a second-place finish. He made a further 3 cup appearances, however he failed to score a goal in them. In his second season, he was unable to keep up his scoring rate from the previous season and, despite netting a hat trick in the cup, he was loaned to Steaua București for the second half of the season. He scored 5 goals in 16 appearances in his second season with the club, including just 2 goals from 15 league matches.

Loan to Steaua
On 21 February 2011, Maicon was loaned out for four months to the Romanian team Steaua București with an option for purchase at the end of the 2010–11 Liga I season.

On 13 April 2011, in his second match at Steaua, he scored his first goal and the only goal in Steaua's victory against Liga I leader Oţelul Galaţi. On 16 April 2011, coming on in the 72nd minute, he scored the equalizer goal in 80th minute and victory goal in 86th minute against Sportul Studenţesc. At the end of the season, he returned to his club in Ukraine.

Return to Volyn
His second season in the Premier League proved much more successful. During the 2011–12 season, he scored 14 goals in the league and 5 in the cup and was the club's top goalscorer. He finished the season with 19 goals from 28 matches and was top goalscorer in the Ukrainian Cup. He also tied Yevhen Seleznyov as top goalscorer in the league. Due to an impressive 2011–12 season, he attracted the interest of reigning Premier League champions Shakhtar Donetsk, joining them on a free transfer.

Shakhtar Donetsk
In the summer of 2012, Maicon joined Shakhtar Donetsk on a free transfer. He signed a three-year contract. On 4 September it was announced that Maicon would join Zorya on loan for six months before joining up with Shakhtar again during the winter break.

Zorya Luhansk
Because he joined Shakhtar after the season had begun Mircea Lucescu, the Shakhtar manager, decided to loan him to Zorya for the first half of the season. But then he was registered by Ukrainian Premier League as a player, who belongs for Zorya, but not on loan. He made his debut on 15 September 2012, coming on as a second-half substitute against club Shakhtar Donetsk. Zorya lost the match 3–0.

Death

In February 2014, Illichivets Mariupol were conducting its winter training in Turkey where on February 6 it played the last friendly match against the Polish side Górnik Zabrze. Maicon spent the first half on the field, yet the Ukrainian team lost 1–2. This turned out to be Maicon's last game. On February 7 the team returned to Ukraine where it was given three days to rest. The next morning, on February 8 around 4 o'clock in the morning while returning home on his Hyundai Elantra near the Kalinin Hospital in Donetsk on prospekt Illicha (Illich Avenue), Maicon entered the ongoing traffic side of the street when maneuvering to pass a vehicle that signalled for a turn to the nearest gas station. While passing on the ongoing traffic lane, the footballer's vehicle made a head-on collision with a Škoda Superb, after which it hit a pole. With multiple injuries, the driver of the Škoda ended up in hospital in a critical condition, while Maicon died on the scene. A possible cause of death was injury to the skull as he hit a stand with his head. Most likely, Maicon was returning from the night club "Litsa" where he was seen with Alex Teixeira, Fred, and Douglas Costa. The club confirmed the news in an official statement that morning.

Shakhtar said that the Brazilian, 25, was a "wonderful person".
"He was a talented footballer, open and friendly guy," the club added. "It is a terrible bereavement for each of us."
Maicon was on loan to Ukrainian league club Illichivets Mariupol until the end of the season.
He joined Shakhtar Donetsk on a free transfer in 2012 from fellow Ukrainian side Volyn Lutsk and made six appearances, scoring one goal. Shakhtar said that his contract would be paid in full to his family as he had a 7-year-old daughter and elderly parents.

References

External links
 profile on Volyn Lutsk's official site
 
  profile on zerozero.pt
 

1988 births
2014 deaths
Brazilian footballers
Brazilian expatriate footballers
Expatriate footballers in Ukraine
Expatriate footballers in Romania
Fluminense FC players
CR Flamengo footballers
FC Volyn Lutsk players
FC Steaua București players
FC Steaua II București players
FC Zorya Luhansk players
FC Shakhtar Donetsk players
FC Mariupol players
Ukrainian Premier League players
Ukrainian First League players
Ukrainian Premier League top scorers
Ukrainian Cup top scorers
Liga I players
Association football forwards
Footballers from Rio de Janeiro (city)
Brazilian expatriate sportspeople in Ukraine
Brazilian expatriate sportspeople in Romania
Road incident deaths in Ukraine